Law 41 of the Laws of Cricket covers unfair play. This law has developed and expanded over time as various incidents of real life unfair play have been legislated against.

The first section of Law 41 makes clear that the captains of the two teams have the responsibility for ensuring that play is conducted according to the spirit and traditions of the game, as well as within its Laws. This leads to a statement that the umpires are the sole judges of fair and unfair play. It contains an override of the Laws of Cricket: if either umpire considers an action that is not covered by the laws to be unfair, he can intervene and call the ball dead.

Fair and unfair play can also refer simply to conventions of the game that are often seen to conform with the Spirit of Cricket.

Ball tampering

The state of the ball affects deliveries to a batsman. Even a new cricket ball is not perfectly spherical, but in two parts stitched together to form a seam. How a ball moves depends in part on how much air resistance there is to different parts of the ball, and therefore to what degree the ball has deteriorated. A cricket team will normally seek, for example, to polish one side of the ball and rough up the other side. The resulting variation in air resistance on the ball can have a marked effect.

Ball tampering has always been a feature of the sport. Players would use objects to rough up one side of the ball, and use resins and substances like Brylcreem to shine the other. This sort of ball tampering is against the spirit of the game and has always been against the rules. Despite this, it has always gone on with limited sanction, and it can be difficult to spot.

The television age has meant that from the 1990s onwards most international games have been televised. Slow motion replays have highlighted a number of incidents of ball tampering: some of which have been widely reported in the press (such as with the Sandpapergate incident). The third section of Law 41 contains the rules and sanctions against ball tampering and requires the umpires to make frequent and irregular inspections of the ball to counter it. It also contains punitive measures against fielders who do tamper with the ball. Match suspensions may be implemented.

Some acts that may alter the ball are permitted. A fielder may polish the ball as long as no artificial substance is used, remove mud from the ball under the supervision of the umpire and dry a wet ball on a towel. But no-one may rub the ball on the ground for any reason, interfere with any of the seams or the surface of the ball, use any implement, or take any other action whatsoever which is likely to alter the condition of the ball.

If a player illegally changes the condition of the ball, the umpires replace the ball with another one with similar wear to the old ball before the ball tampering. The umpires also award five penalty runs to the opposing team and report the incident to the authorities to which the player is responsible. These authorities are then expected to take further disciplinary action against the player as appropriate. If there is a further incidence of ball tampering in the innings the same procedure is followed, but the bowler of the immediately preceding ball is banned from bowling further in that innings too if the tempering was committed by the fielding side.

Distracting the opposition

If a member of the fielding side deliberately distracts or attempts to distract the batsman on strike while he is preparing to receive or receiving a delivery, the umpire immediately declares the ball to be dead. The umpire also informs the fielding captain of the incident and awards five penalty runs to the batting side. The batsman may not be dismissed from the delivery, which must be repeated.

It is also unfair for a member of the fielding side to deliberately attempt to distract or obstruct either batsman after the striker has received the ball by word or action. If this happens a procedure similar to the procedure for the first instance of ball tampering occurs, although the batting side also scores any runs that they have scored before the attempted (or actual) distraction or obstruction.

The case of a batsman obstructing the fielding side is covered by Law 37 of the Laws of Cricket rather than Law 41. A batsman contravening Law 37 may be given out obstructing the field.

Unfair bowling

The bowling of fast short pitched balls may be judged dangerous by the umpire considering their speed, length, height and direction in relation to the skill of the batsman. The umpire calls no-ball and cautions the bowler. If this happens a second time, the bowler is barred from bowling again in that innings, and is also reported to the responsible authority for possible further action. 

Even if not judged dangerous, repetitive short-pitched bowling over head height may be judged unfair. Each individual instance is called no-ball (or wide in the professional game) without contextual judgement of fairness, but if the umpire decides too many have been bowled, will intervene with the sequence of warning, suspension and reporting. Professional cricket has several different codes on this, stating how many instances constitutes unfair.

High full-pitched balls beamers that pass or would have passed the striker on the full above waist height are deemed dangerous. The same sanctions (no-ball, warning, suspension, reporting) apply as to fast short pitched balls. Beamers occur by mistake, when a ball slips in the bowler's hand at the point of delivery, and bowlers usually immediately apologise to the batsman for their mistake. If one is judged to have been bowled deliberately, no-ball is immediately called, the bowler is removed and is reported to the responsible authority for further disciplinary action.

If the umpire considers a bowler has deliberately bowled a front-foot no-ball then the bowler is immediately suspended from bowling in that innings and reported to the authorities for further action.

Time wasting
Time wasting can be used as a deliberate tactic to affect the result of a game. If rain is forecast, a side that is in a losing position can play slow, with the hope that rain will save them and turn the result into a draw rather than a defeat. Time wasting can also be used tactically elsewhere in the game: for instance, to minimise the number of deliveries between a given time and an interval. Law 41 includes rules to counter unfair time wasting.

If the fielding side wastes time, or progresses an over unnecessarily slowly, it is first warned by the umpire. Any further occurrence, there is a further sanction. If the further occurrence happens otherwise than during an over, the batting side is awarded 5 penalty runs. If the further occurrence happens during an over, the bowler is banned from bowling further in the innings. In both instances the relevant Governing Body is informed so it may consider further disciplinary action.

In normal circumstances the striker should always be ready to take strike when the bowler is ready to start his run up. If he wastes time, in the first instance the batsman is warned by the umpire. That warning applies to the batting team as a whole and each incoming batsman is informed of that warning. If there is further time wasting by any batsman in that innings, the umpires award the fielding side 5 runs and inform the Governing Body so it may consider further disciplinary action.

Damaging the pitch
The central portion of the pitch (5 feet from each popping crease, and 1 foot either side of the line joining the centres of the two middle stumps) is designated a protected area (this is the area the ball will most often bounce in). The bowlers from the fielding side should not enter this area during the follow-through of their bowling action, nor should the batsman take guard within it or so close that they would frequently move into it. A bowler will get two warnings should they run into the protected area; should they encroach again, they will be suspended from bowling for the remainder of the innings. A batsman gets one warning and on subsequent transgressions incurs a 5 run penalty.

Each side must also avoid deliberate or avoidable damage to the whole of the pitch (there will be unavoidable damage due to the bowler running off the pitch after bowling and the batsman taking his stance by the popping crease). Each side gets on warning for avoidable damage, any subsequent instance of avoidable damage will see a 5 run penalty awarded to the other side.

Batsmen stealing runs

A bowler may attempt to run out a batsman who leaves his ground before he delivers the ball, but must do so before he reaches the point in his action when he would normally release the ball, with this being known as mankading. It is unfair for batsmen to attempt to steal runs during the bowler's run-up. If they try the umpires will allow the bowler to attempt a run out. Should the bowler not attempt a run out then the umpires will call dead ball, return the batsmen to their previous ends and award a 5 run penalty to the fielding side.

See also
Stealing bases, the baseball equivalent to stealing runs

References 

Cricket laws and regulations